Hvorslev is a Danish village of Region Midtjylland with a population of 211 (1 January 2022). It is, both with the towns of Hadsten, Hinnerup and Hammel, the administrative seat of Favrskov Municipality and until 1 January 2007 it was the seat of the former Hvorslev Municipality.

See also
Aldrup
Vidstrup

References

Municipal seats of the Central Denmark Region
Municipal seats of Denmark
Towns and settlements in Favrskov Municipality
Favrskov Municipality